In oceanography, terrigenous sediments are those derived from the erosion of rocks on land; that is, they are derived from terrestrial (as opposed to marine) environments.  Consisting of sand, mud, and silt carried to sea by rivers, their composition is usually related to their source rocks; deposition of these sediments is largely limited to the continental shelf.

Sources of terrigenous sediments include volcanoes, weathering of rocks, wind-blown dust, grinding by glaciers, and sediment carried by rivers or icebergs.

Terrigenous sediments are responsible for a significant amount of the salt in today's oceans. Over time rivers continue to carry minerals to the ocean but when water evaporates, it leaves the minerals behind. Since chlorine and sodium are not consumed by biological processes, these two elements constitute the greatest portion of dissolved minerals.

Quantity 

Some 1.35 billion tons, or 8% of global river-borne sediment (16.5-17 billion tons globally), is transported by Ganges-Brahmaputra river system annually according to decades old studies, it is unquantified how much variance year to year as well as the impact modern humans have on this amount by holding back sediment in dams, counteracted with increased development of erosion patterns. Wind born sediment also transports billions of tons annually, most prominent in Saharan dust, but thought to be substantially less than rivers; again, variance of year to year and human impacts of land use remain unquantified on this data.  It is well known terrain influences climate conditions, and erosive processes slowly but surely modify terrain along with tectonic causes, but all encompassing studies have been lacking on a global scale to understand how these shape of land and sea factors fit in with both human induced climate change and natural geo-astrological climate variability.

See also
Pelagic sediments
Biogenous Ooze

References

Cited
 

Sedimentary rocks
Sedimentology
Marine geology
Oceanography